Anderson Manoel da Silva (born 29 August 1986), better known as Anderson Braddock, is a Brazilian heavyweight kickboxer and mixed martial artist currently signed to ONE Championship. He has competed in the It's Showtime and K-1, SUPERKOMBAT and GLORY.

Combat Press ranked him in the heavyweight top ten between September 2014 and April 2016.

Biography and career

Early career
Silva began started his kickboxing career at Combat Sport gym in São Paulo, Brazil when he was around 12 or 13 years old. His fighters middle name "Braddock" comes from Col. James Braddock, from the movie Missing In Action. In 2007 Braddock was called up by Peter Aerts, as a sparring partner. Silva moved to Netherlands where he joined Thom Harinck's Chakuriki Gym and made his It's Showtime debut.

Silva took part in the 2009 VIP Fight Night Heavyweight tournament. He defeated Danyo Ilunga by a second round TKO in the quarterfinals, Patrick Liedert by a second round TKO in the semifinals, and faced Hesdy Gerges in the finals. Silva won the fight by TKO in the first round, as Gerges suffered a leg injury in the first round.

He next participated in the 2009 Amsterdam Fight Club four man tournament. Despite beating Brian Douwes by an extra round decision in the semifinals, he lost the final fight against Tomáš Hron by decision.

After a mixed record with the It's Showtime! promotion, during which he scored victories over Stefan Leko, Freddy Kemayo and Michael Duut, Silva participated in the SUPERKOMBAT Heavyweight World Grand Prix. He defeated Nikolaj Falin by unanimous decision in the semifinals, but lost a decision in turn to Cătălin Moroşanu in the finals.

Following the Badr Hari fight, he returned to Brazil to train at Team Nogueira.

Glory
He faced returning legend Remy Bonjasky at Glory 2: Brussels on October 6, 2012 in Brussels, Belgium. After a close three rounds, the bout was called a draw and went into an extension round. He faded and allowed Bonjasky to get the better of him, losing a majority decision.

He competed in the sixteen-man 2012 Glory Heavyweight Grand Slam at Glory 4: Tokyo - 2012 Heavyweight Grand Slam in Saitama, Japan on December 31, 2012. At the opening stage, he defeated Igor Jurković by TKO after dropping the Croatian twice in round one. He was then eliminated in the quarter-finals, however, when he fell victim to Gökhan Saki's left hook in the closing seconds of round one. This was the first stoppage loss of his career.

Braddock was scheduled to fight Singh Jaideep at Glory 8: Tokyo - 2013 65kg Slam on May 3, 2013 but the bout was cancelled.

He then faced Daniel Sam at Glory 9: New York - 2013 95kg Slam in New York City on June 22, 2013 and won by unanimous decision.

He lost to Daniel Ghiță by first round body kick KO in the semi-finals of Glory 11: Chicago - Heavyweight World Championship Tournament in Hoffman Estates, Illinois, United States in October 2013.

He defeated Remy Bonjasky by unanimous decision in a rematch at Glory 13: Tokyo - Welterweight World Championship Tournament in Tokyo, Japan on December 21, 2013.

He defeated Sergei Kharitonov via UD in the semi-finals before suffering a first-round TKO at the hands of Errol Zimmerman in the final of the Glory 16: Denver - Heavyweight Contendership Tournament in Broomfield, Colorado, US on May 3, 2014.

Moving away briefly from Glory, Anderson fought Sergei Kharitonov for the W5 World Heavyweight Title. Kharitonov won the fight by a second round TKO.

Returning to Glory, Silva achieved a mixed record, losing to Jamal Ben Saddik and Ismael Londt, but defeating Maurice Greene and Gordon Haupt. Desipte alternating wins and losses, Silva was nevertheless given a chance to fight Rico Verhoeven for the Glory Heavyweight title. Verhoeven won the fight by TKO, after knocking Silva down three times in the second round.

Silva participated in the 2017 Glory Heavyweight Contender Tournament. He beat Giannis Stoforidis by TKO in the semifinals, but lost a unanimous decision to D'Angelo Marshall in the finals.

ONE Championship
In his first fight with ONE, Silva defeated Andre Meunier by a first round right hook knockout. He subsequently lost to Tarik Khbabez by unanimous decision.

Silva returned to winning ways with a first round TKO of Beybulat Isaev, but lost his next fight against Andrei Stoica by a first round knockout.

He is scheduled to fight Murat Aygün, as a late notice replacement for Roman Kryklia. Aygun won the fight by unanimous decision.

Silva made his return to mixed martial arts on September 24, 2021, facing BJJ world champion Marcus Almeida in the latter's MMA debut at ONE Championship: Revolution. He lost the bout in the first round via north-south choke.

Silva, as a late-notice replacement for Roman Kryklia, faced Iraj Azizpour at ONE Championship: NextGen on October 29, 2021. He lost the fight by unanimous decision.

Silva was scheduled to face  Paul Elliott in a MMA bout at ONE Championship: Only the Brave on January 28, 2022 but it was cancelled.

Silva is scheduled to face Mikhail Jamal Abdul-Latif in a mixed martial arts contest at ONE 159 on July 22, 2022.

Championships and accomplishments

Kickboxing
Demolition Fight 
2007 Brazilian Cruiserweight Championship
Glory
2017 Glory Heavyweight Contender Tournament Runner-up
2014 Glory Heavyweight (+95 kg/209 lb) Contender Tournament Runner-up
VIP Fight Night 
2009 VIP Fight Night Tournament Champion
SUPERKOMBAT Fighting Championship 
2012 SUPERKOMBAT World Grand Prix I Tournament Runner-up

Kickboxing record

|- style="background:#FFBBBB;"
| 2021-10-29 || Loss ||align=left| Iraj Azizpour || ONE Championship: NextGen || Kallang, Singapore || Decision (Unanimous) || 3 || 3:00 
|- style="background:#FFBBBB;"
| 2020-12-04 || Loss ||align=left| Murat Aygün || ONE Championship: Big Bang  || Kallang, Singapore || Decision (Unanimous) || 3 || 3:00
|-  style="background:#FFBBBB;"
| 2019-12-09||Loss ||align=left| Andrei Stoica ||  |ONE Championship: Mark Of Greatness || Kuala Lumpur, Malaysia || KO (Right Cross) || 1 || 1:58
|-  style="background:#cfc;"
| 2019-09-06|| Win ||align=left| Beybulat Isaev || ONE Championship: Immortal Triumph || Ho Chi Minh City, Vietnam || TKO (Punches) || 1 || 2:19
|-  bgcolor="FFBBBB"   
| 2019-06-15 || Loss ||align=left| Tarik Khbabez || ONE Championship: Legendary Quest || Shanghai, China || Decision (Unanimous) || 3 || 3:00
|-  bgcolor="CCFFCC"   
| 2019-04-12 || Win ||align=left| Andre Meunier || ONE Championship: Roots of Honor || Manila, Philippines || KO (Right Hook) || 1 || 1:14  
|-
|-  bgcolor="#CCFFCC"
|2017-12-09 || Win ||align=left| Brian Douwes || Glory 49: Rotterdam || Rotterdam, Netherlands ||Decision (Unanimous) ||3 || 3:00
|- 
|-  bgcolor="#FFBBBB"
| 2017-05-20 || Loss ||align=left| D'Angelo Marshall|| Glory 41: Holland, Final|| Den Bosch, Netherlands || Decision (Unanimous) || 3 || 3:00
|-
! style=background:white colspan=9 |
|-
|-  bgcolor="#CCFFCC"
| 2017-05-20 || Win ||align=left| Giannis Stoforidis|| Glory 41: Holland, Semi Final|| Den Bosch, Netherlands || TKO (punches) || 2 || 2:26
|-  bgcolor="#FFBBBB"
| 2017-02-24 || Loss ||align=left| Benjamin Adegbuyi || Glory 38: Chicago || Hoffman Estates, Illinois, USA || Extra Round Decision (Unanimous) || 4 || 3:00  
|-
|-  bgcolor="#FFBBBB"
| 2016-09-09 || Loss ||align=left| Rico Verhoeven || Glory 33: New Jersey || Trenton, New Jersey || TKO (Referee Stoppage) || 2 || 2:57
|-
! style="background:white" colspan=9 |
|-
|-  bgcolor="#CCFFCC"
| 2016-07-22 || Win ||align=left| Gordon Haupt  || Glory 32: Virginia || Norfolk, Virginia, USA || KO (Liver Kick) || 1 || 1:22
|-  bgcolor="#FFBBBB"
| 2016-04-16|| Loss ||align=left| Ismael Londt || Glory 29: Copenhagen - Heavyweight Contender Tournament, Semi Finals || Copenhagen, Denmark || Decision (Majority) || 3 || 3:00
|-
|-  bgcolor="#CCFFCC"
| 2016-02-26 || Win ||align=left| Maurice Greene || Glory 27: Chicago || Hoffman Estates, Illinois, USA || Decision (Unanimous) || 3 || 3:00
|-
|-  bgcolor="#c5d2ea"
| 2015-08-07 || Loss ||align=left| Jamal Ben Saddik || Glory 23: Las Vegas || Las Vegas, Nevada, USA || NC (overturned) || 3 || 2:55
|-
! style=background:white colspan=9 |
|-
|-  bgcolor="#CCFFCC"
| 2014-10-11 || Loss ||align=left| Sergei Kharitonov || W5 Grand Prix - Rematch || Moscow, Russia || TKO (Punches) || 2 || 2:50
|-
! style=background:white colspan=9 |
|-
|-  bgcolor="#FFBBBB"
| 2014-05-03 || Loss ||align=left| Errol Zimmerman || Glory 16: Denver - Heavyweight Contender Tournament, Final || Broomfield, Colorado, USA || TKO (Right Hook) || 1 || 2:30
|-
! style=background:white colspan=9 |
|-
|-  bgcolor="#CCFFCC"
| 2014-05-03 || Win || align="left" | Sergei Kharitonov || Glory 16: Denver - Heavyweight Contender Tournament, Semi Finals || Broomfield, Colorado, USA || TKO  || 3 || 3:00
|-
|-  bgcolor="#CCFFCC"
| 2013-12-21 || Win ||align=left| Remy Bonjasky || Glory 13: Tokyo || Tokyo, Japan || Decision (Unanimous) || 3 || 3:00
|-  bgcolor="#FFBBBB"
| 2013-10-12 || Loss ||align=left| Daniel Ghiță || Glory 11: Chicago - Heavyweight World Championship Tournament, Semi Finals || Hoffman Estates, Illinois, USA || TKO (Left Body Kick) || 1 || 1:56
|-  bgcolor="#CCFFCC"
| 2013-06-22 || Win ||align=left| Daniel Sam || Glory 9: New York || New York City, New York, USA || Decision (Unanimous) || 3 || 3:00
|-  bgcolor="#FFBBBB"
| 2012-12-31 || Loss ||align=left| Gökhan Saki || Glory 4: Tokyo - Heavyweight Grand Slam Tournament, Quarter Finals || Saitama, Japan || TKO (Left Hook) || 1 || 2:00
|-  bgcolor="#CCFFCC"
| 2012-12-31 || Win ||align=left| Igor Jurković || Glory 4: Tokyo - Heavyweight Grand Slam Tournament, First Round || Saitama, Japan || TKO (Referee Stoppage) || 1 || 1:29
|-  bgcolor="#FFBBBB"
| 2012-10-06 || Loss ||align=left| Remy Bonjasky || Glory 2: Brussels || Brussels, Belgium || Extension round decision (Majority) || 4 ||3:00
|-  bgcolor="#FFBBBB"
| 2012-05-27 || Loss ||align=left| Badr Hari || K-1 World MAX 2012 World Championship Tournament Final 16, Super Fight || Madrid, Spain || Decision (Unanimous) || 3 || 3:00
|- style="" bgcolor="#FFBBBB"
| 2012-02-25 || Loss ||align=left| Cătălin Moroşanu || SUPERKOMBAT World Grand Prix I 2012, Final || Podgorica, Montenegro || Decision (Unanimous) || 3 || 3:00 
|-
! style=background:white colspan=9 |
|-
|- style="" bgcolor="#CCFFCC"
| 2012-02-25 || Win ||align=left| Nikolaj Falin || SUPERKOMBAT World Grand Prix I 2012, Semi Finals || Podgorica, Montenegro || Decision (Unanimous) || 3 || 3:00 
|-  bgcolor="#CCFFCC"
| 2012-01-28 || Win ||align=left| Michael Duut || It's Showtime 2012 in Leeuwarden || Leeuwarden, Netherlands || Decision (Unanimous) || 3 || 3:00
|-  bgcolor="#CCFFCC"
| 2010-12-18 || Win ||align=left| Freddy Kemayo || Fightclub presents: It's Showtime 2010 || Amsterdam, Netherlands || KO (Right High Kick) || 1 || 1:17
|-  bgcolor="#FFBBBB"
| 2010-10-16 || Loss ||align=left| Mourad Bouzidi || United Glory 12: 2010-2011 World Series Quarterfinals || Amsterdam, Netherlands || Decision (Unanimous) || 3 || 3:00
|-  bgcolor= "#CCFFCC"
| 2010-08-14 || Win ||align=left| Kleverson Silva  || VI Desafio Profissional de Muay Thai 1ºRound || São Paulo, Brazil || Decision (Unanimous) || 3 || 3:00
|-
|-  bgcolor="#FFBBBB"
| 2010-05-29 || Loss ||align=left| Mourad Bouzidi || It's Showtime 2010 Amsterdam || Amsterdam, Netherlands || Ext. R Decision || 4 || 3:00
|-  bgcolor=#CCFFCC
| 2010-04-17 || Win ||align=left| Tihamer Brunner || It's Showtime 2010 Budapest || Budapest, Hungary || Decision || 3 || 3:00
|-  bgcolor="#FFBBBB"
| 2010-02-13 || Loss ||align=left| Adnan Redzovic || It's Showtime 2010 Prague || Prague, Czech Republic || Decision (Unanimous) || 3 || 3:00
|-  bgcolor="#CCFFCC"
| 2009-11-21 || Win ||align=left| Dennis Stolzenbach || It's Showtime 2009 Barneveld || Barneveld, Netherlands || Decision (Unanimous)|| 3 || 3:00
|-  bgcolor="#CCFFCC"
| 2009-10-17 || Win ||align=left| Stefan Leko || Ultimate Glory 11: A Decade of Fights || Amsterdam, Netherlands || KO (Punches) || 2 || N/A
|-  bgcolor="#CCFFCC"
| 2009-06-28 || Win ||align=left| Andy Schadenberg || SLAMM!!: New Generation || Almere, Netherlands || Decision (Unanimous) || 3 || 3:00 
|-  bgcolor="#c5d2ea"
| 2009-05-31 || Draw ||align=left| Lloyd van Dams || Next Generation Warriors 3 || Utrecht, Netherlands || Draw || 3 || 3:00
|-  bgcolor="#FFBBBB"
| 2009-04-11 || Loss ||align=left| Tomáš Hron || Amsterdam Fight Club, Final || Amsterdam, Netherlands || Decision || 3 || 3:00
|-
! style=background:white colspan=9 |
|-
|-  bgcolor="#CCFFCC"
| 2009-04-11 || Win ||align=left| Brian Douwes || Amsterdam Fight Club, Semi Final || Amsterdam, Netherlands || Ext.R. Decision (Unanimous) || 4 || 3:00
|-  bgcolor="#CCFFCC"
| 2009-03-21 || Win ||align=left| Hesdy Gerges || VIP Fight Night 2009, Final || Neuss, Germany || TKO (Doctor Stop/Leg injury) || 1 || 2:28
|-
! style=background:white colspan=9 |
|-
|-  bgcolor="#CCFFCC"
| 2009-03-21 || Win ||align=left| Patrick Liedert || VIP Fight Night 2009, Semi Final || Neuss, Germany || TKO (Referee Stoppage) || 2 || 2:32
|-  bgcolor="#CCFFCC"
| 2009-03-21 || Win ||align=left| Danyo Ilunga || VIP Fight Night 2009, Quarter Final || Neuss, Germany || KO (Punches) || 2 || 2:07
|-  bgcolor="#CCFFCC"
| 2009-02-15 || Win ||align=left| Tarik Charkoui || Noord Gestoord || Amsterdam, Netherlands || TKO (Ref Stop/3 Knockdowns) || 1 || N/A
|-  bgcolor="#CCFFCC"
| 2009-01-29 || Win ||align=left| Tommy van Wijngaarden || Gala De Beuk || Oudenbosch, Netherlands || Decision || 3 || 3:00
|-  bgcolor="#FFBBBB"
| 2008-10-05 || Loss ||align=left| Tomáš Hron || Tough Is Not Enough || Rotterdam, Netherlands || Decision (Unanimous) || 3 || 3:00
|-
! style=background:white colspan=9 |
|-
|-  bgcolor="#CCFFCC"
| 2008-05-07 || Win ||align=left| Rodney Glunder || Amsterdam Fight Club || Amsterdam, Netherlands || Decision || 3 || 3:00
|-  bgcolor="#CCFFCC"
| 2007-11-10 || Win ||align=left| Carlos Augusto Inocente || Demolition Fight 6 || São Paulo, Brazil || Decision (Unanimous) || 3 || 3:00 
|-
! style=background:white colspan=9 |
|-
|-  bgcolor="#CCFFCC"
| 2006-09-23 || Win ||align=left| Jerônimo dos Santos || Demolition Fight 4 || São Paulo, Brazil || TKO (Ref Stop/3 Knockdowns) || 1 || N/A
|-  bgcolor="#CCFFCC"
| 2006-04-08 || Win ||align=left| Douglas Boi || Demolition Fight 3 || São Paulo, Brazil || TKO (Strikes) || 1 || N/A
|-  bgcolor="#CCFFCC"
| 2005-10-23 || Win ||align=left| Marcos Rogério || Demolition Fight 2 || São Paulo, Brazil || TKO (Doctor Stoppage) || 3 ||  1:11
|-
| colspan=9 | Legend:    

font-size:85%;

Mixed martial arts record

|-
|Loss
|align=center|3–2
|Marcus Almeida
|Submission (north-south choke) 
|ONE Championship: Revolution
|
|align=center|1	
|align=center|2:55
|Kallang, Singapore
|
|-
|Win
|align=center|3–1
|Julio Cesar Lima
|TKO (punches)
|WOCS 50
|
|align=center|1
|align=center|0:44
|Rio de Janeiro, Brazil
|
|-
|Loss
|align=center|2–1
|Dritan Barjamaj
|TKO (punches)
|Shooto Switzerland
|
|align=center|2
|align=center|2:01
|Horgen, Switzerland
|
|-
|Win
|align=center|2–0
|Luke Morton
|Submission (arm triangle choke)
|HIT Fighting Championship 3
|
|align=center|1
|align=center|0:58
|Zurich, Switzerland
|
|-
|Win
|align=center|1–0
|Ruud Vernooij
|TKO (punches)
|HIT Fighting Championship 2
|
|align=center|2
|align=center|2:01
|Zurich, Switzerland
|

See also
List of male kickboxers

References

1986 births
Living people
Brazilian male kickboxers
Cruiserweight kickboxers
Heavyweight kickboxers
Brazilian expatriates in the Netherlands
Sportspeople from São Paulo
Glory kickboxers
SUPERKOMBAT kickboxers
ONE Championship kickboxers
Brazilian male mixed martial artists
Mixed martial artists utilizing kickboxing